Education in Guinea-Bissau is compulsory from the age of 7 to 13. In 1998, the gross primary enrollment rate was 53.5 percent, with higher enrollment ratio for males (67.7 percent) compared with females (40 percent). 

In 2011 the literacy rate in Guinea-Bissau was estimated at 55.3% (68.9% male, and 42.1% female).

See also
List of universities in Guinea-Bissau

References